The Chiltan ibex or Chiltan goat (Capra aegagrus chialtanensis) is a wild goat endemic to Chiltan, Balochistan, Pakistan.

Description
Males are reddish-gray in color. Some males have dark brown or black chests, sometimes a dark shoulder stripe (like Bezoar ibex). Females are reddish-gray with a dark brown dorsal stripe and white legs with a dark brown marking below the knees.
Horns are similar to Bezoar ibex, they flat in cross and sharply curved at front and form a long, open spiral that is normally a complete turn or a little more, their horns reaches the length of 29 inches (73.7 cm), however, the longest of record measured 40 inches (101.6 cm) (Rowland Ward, 1969).

Behavior 
Chiltan ibexes are social and diurnal. There rut starts in mid-October and is over by third week of November. 
Youngs are born from late-March to early-April, with twins occurring frequently.

Distributions & Status
There four to five populations in early 1970s in Chiltan, Mordar, Koh-i-Maran and Koh-i-Gishk (ranges at south of Quetta). 
By 1975, the uncontrolled hunting by locals reduced population to 170 in Sulaiman Mountains area, (now Hazarganji-Chiltan National Park).
By 1990, the population was increased by 480. The Forest and Wildlife Department Balochistan has made an endeavour and saved the Chiltan ibex which is an endangered subspecies.

References

Capra (genus)
Goats
Mammals of Pakistan
Endemic fauna of Pakistan
Chiltan ibex

pnb:کوہ چلتن
ur:کوہ چلتن